Gardner Stow (August 1789 – June 25, 1866) was an American lawyer and politician who served as New York State Attorney General.

Early life
The family removed first to Warrensburg, and in 1802 to Bolton. In 1806, he moved to Sandy Hill, New York to study law with Roswell Weston, and made the acquaintance of fellow students Silas Wright, Zebulon R. Shipherd, and Esek Cowen, who were studying with Roger Skinner. When Cowen was admitted to the bar and commenced practice, Stow continued his studies at the office of Gansevoort and Cowen in Gansevoort's Mills, Saratoga County, New York. He was admitted to the bar in 1811, and practiced with Cowen in Northumberland, before later relocating to Elizabethtown.

Military service
Stow served in the War of 1812 as a member of two different units of the New York Militia, a company commanded by John Calkins of Elizabethtown, and a regiment commanded by Ransom Noble of Essex.  He was a corporal in the company, and a sergeant major in the regiment.

Stow remained in the militia after the war, and in 1819 he was appointed Judge Advocate of the 40th Brigade; later in 1819 he was appointed adjutant of the 37th Regiment.

Early career
Stow was active in politics and government, first as a Federalist, then as a Democratic-Republican, and later as a Democrat.  He served as a justice of the peace beginning in 1813, was Elizabethtown's Postmaster, and also served terms as Essex County Treasurer.

Temperance advocate
In 1808, Stow was one of the founders of the Moreau and Northumberland Temperance Society, the first such society organized in New York State. In 1834, in an address delivered before a Temperance Society in Keeseville, he was "the first man to advocate legislation to prohibit all traffic in intoxicating liquor, as a beverage."  Newspaper articles in 1858 indicated that four members of the temperance society organized in Moreau and Northumberland were still alive, including Stow, and that he had advocated for temperance throughout his career.

Later career
Stow later moved to Keeseville, New York, and was District Attorney of Essex County from 1838 to 1844.  In 1840, he was an unsuccessful Democratic candidate for the New York State Senate.  In the 1840s, he also carried out court-related assignments as commissioner in bankruptcy, master in chancery, and examiner in chancery.

In 1845, Stow moved to Troy, New York, where he continued to practice law.  After the resignation of Levi S. Chatfield, he was appointed New York State Attorney General by Governor Horatio Seymour on December 8, 1853, to fill the vacancy until the end of the year.

Death
He died in Troy on June 25, 1866.

Family
Stow's first wife, Charlotte, died young.  In 1831, Stow married Sophia Patrick of Windsor, Vermont.

His daughter Evelina Charlotte Stow (1812–1839) married Sewall Sylvester Cutting (1813–1882) in 1836, and their only son was Gardner Stow Cutting (1838–1883).

Notes

Sources
Gardner Stow at Political Graveyard
Marriage notice Danville, Vermont North Star, at Rootsweb
The New York State Register for 1843 edited by O. L. Holley, page 373, (J. Disturnell, Albany NY, 1843)
The New York State Register for 1847 edited by Orville Luther Holley, page 83, (J. Disturnell, New York NY, 1847)
The New York Civil List compiled by Franklin Benjamin Hough (Weed, Parsons and Co., 1858)
Obituary of Sewall S. Cutting, in New York Times on February 8, 1882 (giving wrong middle initial "H." for his older son)

1789 births
1866 deaths
People from Orange, Massachusetts
People from Warren County, New York
People from Northumberland, New York
Politicians from Troy, New York
People from Keeseville, New York
People from Warrensburg, New York
People from New York (state) in the War of 1812
New York (state) Federalists
New York (state) Democratic-Republicans
New York (state) Democrats
New York (state) state court judges
County district attorneys in New York (state)
New York State Attorneys General
19th-century American judges